is a Japanese television drama series that first aired on TBS in 1980.

Cast
 Kyōhei Shibata - Tetsuo Suzuki
 Ikue Sakakibara - Hanako Suzuki
 Pinko Izumi - Sumire Suzuki
 Emi Watanabe
 Katsutoshi Arata - Hideharu Suzuki
 Gaku Yamamoto - Taichi Suzuki
 Haruko Mabuchi
 Hisashi Igawa
 Harue Akagi - Toyo Suzuki
 Eitaro Ozawa - Iwao Sawada

References

1980 Japanese television series debuts
1981 Japanese television series endings
Japanese drama television series
TBS Television (Japan) dramas
Wrongful convictions in fiction